The Corrente River (Portuguese, Rio Corrente) is a river of Goiás state in central Brazil. It is a tributary of the Paranaíba River, which it enters in the reservoir created by Ilha Solteira Dam, on the Paraná River.

See also
 List of rivers of Goiás
 Tributaries of the Río de la Plata

References

Brazilian Ministry of Transport

Rivers of Goiás